Montserrat Gudiol (Montserrat Gudiol i Corominas; 9 June 1933 – 25 December 2015) was a Catalonian painter.

Biography 
Gudiol was born in Barcelona as the daughter of the art historian José Gudiol Ricart, who authored many books and ran a medieval painting restoration studio. She trained in his studio and began painting on her own in 1950.

Gudiol died in Barcelona.

Works
She is known for her portrayals of (mostly female) figures portrayed in space with ambiguous backgrounds. Some of her work seems to recall Hieronymus Bosch with a wink at her father's studio, and others seem to reflect the works of famous painters of her day such as Picasso.

References 

 Montserrat Gudiol, Great Women Masters of Art, by Jordi Vigué, 2002
 Royal Academy of Fine Arts of Sant Jordi biography page
Official website

1933 births
2015 deaths
People from Barcelona
Spanish women painters